The 206th Coastal Division was an infantry division of the Royal Italian Army during World War II. Royal Italian Army coastal divisions were second line divisions formed with reservists and equipped with second rate materiel. Recruited locally, they were often commanded by officers called out of retirement.

History 
The division was activated on 15 November 1941 in Catania by reorganizing the VI Coastal Sector Command. The division was assigned to XVI Army Corps, which was responsible for the defense of the eastern half of the island of Sicily. The division had its headquarter in Modica and was responsible for the coastal defense of the coast between Punta Braccetto in Santa Croce Camerina and Arenella to the South of Syracuse.

The division defended the beaches where the British Eighth Army landed during the Allied invasion of Sicily on 10 July 1943. On D-day the 206th Coastal Division and British forces fought for control of the beaches at Avola, Castelluzzo and Cassibile, but the British superiority in materiel and numbers crushed the 206th Coastal Division, which by 11 July was reduced to small units surrounded by British forces. On 12 July British troops eliminated the last resistance and the division was declared lost due to wartime events.

Organization 
 206th Coastal Division
 122nd Coastal Regiment
 CCXLIII Coastal Battalion
 CCCLXXIV Coastal Battalion
 CCCLXXV Coastal Battalion
 123rd Coastal Regiment
 CCCLXXXI Coastal Battalion
 CCCLXXXIII Coastal Battalion
 DXLII Coastal Battalion
 146th Coastal Regiment
 CDXXX Coastal Battalion
 CDXXXVII Coastal Battalion
 44th Coastal Artillery Regiment
 CII Coastal Artillery Group (75/27 field guns)
 CLXI Coastal Artillery Group (149/35 heavy guns)
 CLXII Coastal Artillery Group (149/35 heavy guns; transferred to the XVIII Coastal Brigade in April 1943)
 CLXIV Coastal Artillery Group (149/35 heavy guns)
 CCIX Coastal Artillery Group (100/22 howitzers)
 CCXXIV Coastal Artillery Group (100/22 howitzers)
 227th Coastal Artillery Battery (105/14 howitzers)
 CIV Machine Gun Battalion
 511th Machine Gun Company
 537th Machine Gun Company
 542nd Machine Gun Company
 625th Machine Gun Company
 122nd Mixed Engineer Platoon
 123rd Mixed Engineer Platoon
 206th Carabinieri Section
 163rd Field Post Office
 Division Services

Attached to the division:
 CCXXXIII Self-propelled Anti-tank Battalion (47/32 L40 self-propelled guns)
 Armored Train 102/1/T, in Syracuse (6x 102/35 Mod. 1914 naval guns, 4x 20/77 anti-aircraft guns)

Commanding officers 
The division's commanding officer was:

 Generale di Divisione Achille d'Havet (15 November 1941 - 12 July 1943, POW)

References 

 
 

Coastal divisions of Italy
Infantry divisions of Italy in World War II